= Abd Al-Bir Al-Fayumi =

Egyptian writer and scholar

- Born: Faiyum Governorate
- Died: Constantinople
- Occupations: Writer, scholar

Abd Al-Bir Al-Fayumi (full name Abd Al-Bir Bin Abdulqadir Bin Mohammed Al-Aowfi Al-Fayomi (Arabic: عبد البر الفيومي); died 1171 AH / 1757/58 AD) was an Egyptian writer and scholar.

== Early life and education ==
Abd Al-Bir Al-Fayumi is from the Al-Fayom family in Cairo, Egypt, where he was born, raised and attended school. He travelled to Mecca before traveling to the Levant and staying in Damascus for a period of about two years, and publishing some of his pamphlets and publications there.

== Career ==
Throughout his life, Abd Al-Bir Al-Fayumi held a number of different positions, however he specialized in writing, literature, and copyrighting, which helped his rise to fame. At the beginning of his career, Al-Fayumi published a book titled Montazah Al-Ayoun wa Al-Albab Fi Bae'th Al-Mota'kireen min Ahil Al-Adaab. More books followed, including Al-Lataef Al-Monefah, Hosin Al-sanee' Fi Elm Al-Badea, Al-qoul Al-wafi Beshar'h Al-Kafi, Buloog Al-Arib wa Al-Soul Bil-tsharif B'thikr Nasab Al-rasool, and At'haf Al-Nobala' B'akbaar, among others in addition to various pamphlets.

== Works ==
Abd Al-Bir Al-Fayumi's most notable works, with transliterated Arabic titles, include:

- Montazah Al-Ayoun wa Al-Albab Fi Bae’th Al-Mota’kireen min Ahil Al-Adaab
- Al-Lataef Al-Monefah
- Hosin Al-sanee’ Fi Elm Al-Badea
- Bade’yah (Ala Harf Al-noon)
- Al-qoul Al-wafi Beshar'h Al-Kaf.
- Buloog Al-Arib wa Al-Soul Bil-tsharif B'thikr Nasab Al-rasool
- At'haf Al-Nobala' B'akbaar
